Gil González may refer to:

Gil González Dávila, 16th-century Spanish Conquistador, discoverer of Nicaragua
Gil González Dávila (historian),  17th-century Spanish biographer and antiquary